Mount Begbie is a  mountain summit located  in the Gold Range of  the Monashee Mountains in British Columbia, Canada. Situated west of the Columbia River high above the shore of Upper Arrow Lake, this prominent peak is visible from the Trans-Canada Highway, Revelstoke, and Revelstoke Mountain Resort ski area. Mt. Begbie Brewing Company, a brewery, was named after the mountain. The nearest peak is Mount Tilley,  to the west, and the nearest higher peak is Blanket Mountain,  to the south.

History
Mount Begbie is named for Sir Matthew Baillie Begbie (1819–1894), a prominent judge in the British Columbia colony. The first ascent of the mountain was accomplished June 11, 1907, by James Robert Robertson, J. Herdman, and Rupert W. Haggen, with Edward Feuz Jr. as guide. The mountain's name was officially adopted in 1932 when approved by the Geographical Names Board of Canada,  although this toponym had appeared in publications as early as 1887, if not earlier.

Climate

Based on the Köppen climate classification, Mount Begbie is located in a subarctic climate zone with cold, snowy winters, and mild summers. Most precipitation runoff from Mount Begbie drains east into tributaries of the Columbia River; however, a portion drains west into the Eagle River, a tributary of the Fraser River.

Geology
Mount Begbie is a gabbroic volcanic plug, and one of the volcanoes of the Chilcotin Group. More than 50 small pegmatite bodies on the northern slope of the mountain are relatively well known among prospectors.

See also

Geology of British Columbia
Geography of British Columbia

References

External links
 Weather: Mount Begbie

Two-thousanders of British Columbia
Monashee Mountains
Kootenay Land District